Avial is an Indian dish.

Avial (alternatively, Aviyal) may also refer to:
 Avial (band)
 Avial NV
 Aviyal (2016 film)
 Aviyal (2022 film)